T&T Baoercheng FC was a Vietnamese football club.

Saigon United threatens to sue VFF

Saigon United threatens to sue the Vietnam Football Federation in the international sports court after Quang Ngai’s demotion which means that some of their victories are not recognized, Saigon United (SU) claims, leading to a loss of points that downgrades their team to the Second Division Tournament for the 2010 season.

Saigon United was denied an official voice at the sixth-term meeting of the Vietnam Football Federation for failing to register in time.

The Second Division club, which is taking its case for reinstatement in the First Division to the court of arbitration, was meant to register by September 30 but left it too late.

Because of the mistake, Saigon United was reduced to the role of observer at the preparatory meeting on Wednesday.

The club’s case for reinstatement in the First Division is that it was unfairly penalized when the VFF demoted Quang Ngai.

External links
 http://www.thanhniennews.com/sports/?catid=5&newsid=53193
 http://www.lookatvietnam.com/2009/09/football-leaders-review-a%c2%80%c2%98excitinga%c2%80%c2%99-season-filled-with-problems.html

Football clubs in Vietnam
Football clubs in Ho Chi Minh City
Association football clubs established in 2004
2004 establishments in Vietnam
Association football clubs disestablished in 2014
2014 disestablishments in Vietnam